The Nutty Squirrels Present is a 1960 animated television series that was inspired by characters from The Nutty Squirrels hit 1959 novelty record. The series was produced by Transfilm-Wylde Animation, and aired for one season (1960–1961) on first-run syndication in the United States with over 150 six-minute episodes, being formatted originally into 30 half-hour shows.

The original cartoons themselves were purchased from overseas countries like Eastern Europe, by the Russian born, Fima Noveck, the President of Flamingo Telefilm Sales. After the original cartoons arrived in the United States, they would receive a new soundtrack, including English language and music, that would appeal to American children.

Reception
In his 2019 autobiography, Mr. Know-It-All, John Waters wrote, "I should have told my mother about the Nutty Squirrels. They did jazz and they weren't junkies. This sped-up vocal group who imitated the Chipmunks actually beat them to television with an animated show called The Nutty Squirrels Present, and they looked down on the pop sound of Alvin and his gang. The Nutty Squirrels actually had a big jazz hit with "Uh Oh, Part One and Two," but if you go back and listen to the rest of their discography, you'll be blown away by some of their other riffs. These cats were smoking! If my mom had heard jazz like this at the wrong speed, she might have loved it."

Broadcasting television stations

United States

 WSBK-TV  / Channel 38•      Boston, Massachusetts
 KTVI-TV  / Channel 2•       St. Louis, Missouri
 KYTV-TV  / Channel 44•      Springfield, Ohio
 WKBN-TV  / Channel 27•      Youngstown, Ohio
 WLBC-TV / Channel 49• Muncie, Indiana
 WGN-TV   / Channel 9•       Chicago, Illinois
 KVOS-TV  / Channel 38•      Bellingham, Washington
 KHSL-TV  / Channel 43•      Chico, California

Canada

 KVOS-TV / Channel 12• via Bellingham, Washington

Overseas

Australia

Known in Australia simply as The Nutty Squirrels, the series was first transmitted on Australian television during early 1966, on the ABC. It first featured as part of a series called Cartoon Time, which ran on Saturday afternoons at 5pm. This 40-minute program also consisted of other cartoons, including King Leonardo and His Short Subjects and Felix the Cat.

The Nutty Squirrels cartoon series then made frequent appearances over the years, appearing off and on in 1970 and also during 1972. At the time in Australia, these transmissions were in black and white.

From 1976, the Nutty Squirrels series was again shown, this time in its original color format.

The main transmission of the Nutty Squirrels cartoon series in Australia came in the form of a package of at least 80 x 6 minute episodes. From December 1977, the Nutty Squirrels series was permanently adapted to the 5:30pm weekday timeslot, running Monday through to Friday. During this run, the Nutty Squirrels series ran right through to March 1979.

 ABC-TV Channel 2 Sydney, NSW Australia
 ABC-TV Channel 3 Canberra, ACT Australia

Through the ABC's facilities in Sydney, the cartoon was relayed and broadcast to all the other Australian state capital cities, plus all the Australian regional areas covered by the ABC.

After broadcast on the ABC, the Nutty Squirrels series, was for a short time, resyndicated to some of Australia's regional commercial television stations. These were mainly in NSW, with the broadcasts occurring during 1981 and 1982.

 NRN Channel 11 Northern Rivers, NSW Australia
 RTN Channel 8  Northern Rivers NSW Australia
 RVN Channel 2  Wagga, NSW Australia
 CTC Channel 7  Canberra, ACT Australia

List of the cartoon shorts used in the series

001	A barrel of fun
002	A horse for dinner
003	A recipe for courage
004	A Santa visit
005	A very strange adventure
006	An old fable
007	And so on
008	Animal school
009	Animals in dreamland
010	Bad company
011	Bear cub at large
012	Big deal
013	Big little hero
014	Brave whistle light
015	Bullies in a toyshop
016	Cheese hunters
017	Chess game in the sky
018	Dangerous dreamland
019	Detective nightmare
020	Dodo and the monster
021	Dog magician hunt
022	Don’t be a pig
023	Dumb Dora
024	Enchanted morning
025	Eraser and the pencil
026	Fire and ice
027	Fire fighters
028	Foxy wolf
029	Friendship Island
030	Golden feather
031	Gone with the goose
032	Grandpa Caleb’s canoe
033	Grandpa whirlwind
034	Happy end
035	His master’s mouse
036	Hole in the sky
037	How it all began
038	Hurray for the winner
039	Imp and the angel
040	Just reward
041	Kingdom of color
042	Kings conscience
043	Kitten Blues
044	Life in doggywood
045	Life with Eva
046	Lion and gazelle
047	Lion and the donkey
048	Locomotive
049	Magic mirror
050	Magic mountain
051	Magic penny
052	Magic room
053	Magic wood
054	Malicious ink spot
055	Marsh King
056	Master skier
057	Millie the kid
058	Monkey and the atom
059	Monkey business
060	Moon monster
061	On the moon
062	Once upon a time
063	One and one is two
064	One little pig
065	One sunny day
066	Pedro's secret
067	Play ball
068	Pole painters
069	Polite neighbors
070	Prehistoric adventure
071	Puppy’s pets
072	Rabbit’s feet for luck
073	Railroad story
074	Recipe for courage
075	Red riding hood
076	Road pest
077	Robin and the bumble bee
078	Round and round
079	Scarecrow adventure
080	Shining star
081	Shoo! Fire!
082	Sing sing sparrow
083	Skating follies
084	Sleepy keeper
085	Sticks and stones
086	Stop thief
087	Storm in a coop
088	Teamwork
089	Teddy wants to sleep
090	The barefoot king
091	The bargain
092	The beggars treasure
093	The bouncing bassoon
094	The brave mosquito
095	The concertina
096	The dinosaur hunt
097	The drought
098	The faker
099	The first song
100	The great bank robbery
101	The hold up
102	Kind orphan
103	The king and the shepherd
104	The lion cub
105	The little cobbler
106	The little glutton
107	The lonely mermaid
108	The magic rainbow
109	The magic wand
110	The old man and the spring
111	The party
112	The peace treaty
113	The puppeteer
114	The racers
115	The rescue
116	The Santa visit
117	The scheme
118	The soccer game
119	The stableboy and the Princess
120	The statue
121	The trouble shooter
122	The wind
123	The wolf trap
124	The wooden boy
125	Thermometer fever
126	Three clumsy hunters
127	Three lumberjacks
128	Tiger trouble
129	Tit for tat
130	To Texas and back
131	Treacherous fox
132	Two magicians
133	Wanderlust
134	War and peace
135	War of colors
136	What a boar
137	Wheels
138	When in Rome, don’t
139	Where there's smoke, there’s fame
140	Who's cooking
141	Who's scared
142	Winged wedding
143	Winter palace
144	Woody in toyland
145	Zoo revolution

See also
 The Alvin Show
 The Nutty Squirrels

References

External links
 
 The Nutty Squirrels Present at Toon Tracker
 Nutty Squirrels cartoon "Tiger Trouble" at YouTube

1960 American television series debuts
1961 American television series endings
1960s American animated television series
American children's animated television series
Animated television series about squirrels
First-run syndicated television programs in the United States